George P. Smith may refer to:

George P. Smith (chemist) (born 1941), American Nobel Prize laureate
George P. Smith (politician) (1873–1942), Canadian politician and Minister of the Crown
George P. Smith II (born 1939), American professor of law
George Paton Smith (1829–1877), Australian politician and Attorney-General of Victoria